Leptogium corniculatum is a species of fungus belonging to the family Collemataceae.

It has cosmopolitan distribution.

References

corniculatum